Cigar Aficionado is an American magazine that is dedicated to enjoying the “good life” and the world of cigars. Published since September 1992, the magazine is known for its profiles on celebrities including Michael Jordan, Jack Nicholson, The Rock, Demi Moore, Robert De Niro, Arnold Schwarzenegger, Usher, Nick Jonas, Tom Selleck, Hugh Jackman, Wayne Gretzky, Charles Barkley, and for its articles and blind tastings about handrolled, premium cigars, along with stories about golf, travel and luxury goods and experiences. The magazine was launched by Marvin R. Shanken's M. Shanken Communications, the publisher of Wine Spectator magazine since 1976. The current executive editor is David Savona.

Publication history

Origins

Cigar Aficionado magazine debuted in the fall of 1992, launched in New York City by Marvin R. Shanken, longtime publisher of Wine Spectator magazine. Prior to launching the publication, Shanken engaged in extensive market research, collecting more than 1,300 four-page surveys of cigar smokers which detailed their occupation, income, net worth, travel tendencies, as well as their drinking and smoking habits. Survey results revealed a well-heeled and dedicated male demographic, with survey respondents professing an average household income of $194,000 and a net worth of $1.54 million and claiming to smoke on average ten cigars per week. Shanken launched a large-format glossy magazine aimed at corralling these readers and advertisers of products targeted to this audience.

Cigar Aficionado began as a lifestyle magazine, including coverage of wine, spirits, travel, gambling, and antiques, in addition to interviews with leading personalities in the cigar industry and feature articles relating to the cigarmaking industry. From the beginning the magazine emphasized interviews with celebrity cigar smokers, including cover stories on Rush Limbaugh, Jack Nicholson, and Arnold Schwarzenegger. The new magazine's successful blending of lifestyle reports and celebrity glitz has been credited with contributing to the 1990s cigar boom.

The publication scored its first great journalistic coup on February 4, 1994, when editor and publisher Shanken met Fidel Castro in Havana for a two-hour interview. During this interview Castro recounted the story behind the establishment of the Cohiba brand, told stories of the importance of cigars to his life as a revolutionary in the mountains of Cuba, and explained his decision to give up cigar smoking in August 1986 as part of a national campaign against tobacco use. In addition to these topics of special interest to cigar smokers, the interview touched upon bilateral relations between the United States and Cuba, during the course of which Castro accused the United States of repeatedly "moving the goalposts back" for ending the Cuban economic embargo and said that "no other country has as unblemished behavior about human rights" as Cuba.

Ratings

From its inception, Cigar Aficionado has made use of blind taste testing of cigars, comparing the merits of one brand to another, expressed on the basis of a 100-point scale similar to the one successfully used in sister publication Wine Spectator.

Cigar of the Year

See also
Tobacco

References

External links
Cigar Aficionado web site

Lifestyle magazines published in the United States
Cigars
Monthly magazines published in the United States
Magazines established in 1992
Magazines published in New York City